Al-Qanjarah is a town in northwestern Syria, administratively part of the Latakia Governorate, located north of Latakia. Nearby localities include al-Shamiyah and Kirsana to the north, Burj al-Qasab to the west, Sitmarkho to the east, Baksa and Sqoubin to the south. According to the Syria Central Bureau of Statistics, Al-Qanjarah had a population of 4,142 in the 2004 census. Its inhabitants are predominantly Alawites.

References

Populated places in Latakia District
Alawite communities in Syria